Dioxys may refer to:
 Dioxys (bee), a genus of bees in the family Megachilidae
 Dioxys (alga), a genus of algae in the family Characiopsidaceae